Sri Lanka is a tropical island situated close to the southern tip of India. The invertebrate fauna is as large as it is common to other regions of the world. There are about 2 million species of arthropods found in the world, and still is counting.

The following list provides the earwigs currently identified from Sri Lanka.

Earwig
The exact diversity and their biology is well studied within Sri Lanka due to major contributions by Malcolm Burr in 1901 and Alan Brindle in 1977. According to a checklist by Steinmann in 1989, 71 species of earwigs may be found in Sri Lanka,  distributed between 11 families and 21 genera.

Family Anisolabididae
Anisolabis greeni 
Anisolabis kelangi 
Anisolabis kudagae 
Epilandex burri 
Euborellia annulipes 
Euborellia stali 
Gonolabis electa 
Geracodes brincki 
Platylabia major

Family Apachyidae
Dendroiketes corticinus

Family Apataniidae
Apsilochorema diffine

Family Chelisochidae
Chelisoches morio

Family Diplatyidae
Diplatys fletcheri 
Diplatys greeni 
Diplatys incisus 
Diplatys porpinquus
Schizodiplatys malayanus

Family Forficulidae
Cordax ceylonicus 
Eparchus insignis
Forficula auricularia
Hypurgus humeralis 
Obelura dohertyi

Family Labiduridae
Labidura japonica 
Labidura riparia 
Nala lividipes

Family Pygidicranidae
Cranopygia nietneri 
Cranopygia parva 
Cranopygia pluto 
Echinosoma parvulum 
Echinosoma trilineatum 
Epicranopygia picta

Family Spongiphoridae
Chaetospania anderssoni 
Chaetospania foliata 
Chaetospania thoracica 
Irdex ceylonensis
Labia curvicauda
Labia minor
Paralabella curvicauda
Parabella fruehstorferi
Spirolabia pilicornis
Paralabella rehni
Paralabellula rotundifrons
Spongovostox mucronatus 
Spongovostox semiflavus 
Spongovostox tripunctatus 
Syntonus neolobophoroides

See also
 List of Dermapterans of Australia

References

 
.Sri Lanka
Dermaptera
Sri Lanka